Abigail Wilson (born 27 June 1998) is a field hockey player from Australia, who plays as a forward.

Personal life
Abigail Wilson was born and raised in Lithgow, New South Wales.

Career

Domestic leagues

Australian Hockey League
In the Australian Hockey League (AHL), Wilson played for her home state as a member of the NSW Arrows. She made her AHL debut in 2016, winning a bronze medal. She followed this up with a bronze medal in 2017, and a gold medal in 2018 at the last edition of the tournament.

Hockey One
Following the overhaul of the AHL and subsequent introduction of the Hockey One, Wilson was named in the squad for New South Wales's new representative team, the NSW Pride. She made her debut for the team in the first game of the tournament, against the Adelaide Fire.

National teams

Under–21
After debuting for the Australian Under–23 side in early November 2018, Wilson made her debut for the Jillaroos later that month during a Trans–Tasman test series against the New Zealand Under–21 side in Hastings, New Zealand.

Under–23
Wilson made her debut for the Australian Under–23 side in November 2018, during a tour of China.

References

External links
 
 

1998 births
Living people
Australian female field hockey players
Female field hockey forwards
Lithgow, New South Wales
Sportswomen from New South Wales